The 2005 UCI Mountain Bike & Trials World Championships were held in Livigno, Italy from 31 August to 4 September 2005.
The disciplines included were cross-country, downhill, four-cross, and trials.
The event was the 16th edition of the UCI Mountain Bike World Championships and the 20th edition of the UCI Trials World Championships.

Medal summary

Men's events

Women's events

Team events

Medal table

See also
2005 UCI Mountain Bike World Cup
UCI Mountain Bike Marathon World Championships

References

External links
 Results for the mountain-bike events on cyclingnews.com
 Results for the trials events on uci.ch

UCI Mountain Bike World Championships
International cycle races hosted by Italy
UCI Mountain Bike and Trials World Championships
Mountain biking events in Italy